The 1997–98 Divizia D was the 56th season of the Liga IV, the fourth tier of the Romanian football league system. The champions of each county association play against one from a neighboring county in a play-off match played on a neutral venue. The winners of the play-off matches promoted to Divizia C.

Promotion play-off 

The matches was scheduled to be played on 28 May 1998.

|colspan=3 style="background-color:#97DEFF;"|28 May 1998

|}

County leagues

Arad County

Harghita County

Hunedoara County

Mureș County

Neamț County

Prahova County

Sibiu County

See also 
 1997–98 Divizia A
 1997–98 Divizia B

References

External links
 FRF

Liga IV seasons
4
Romania